To Hurt and to Heal is a Canadian documentary film, directed by Laura Sky and released in 1986. The film presents a portrait of neonatal medical care, centred on the stories of three children: a child who was born premature and survived for six weeks before his death; a "miracle baby" who was saved by emergency heart surgery; and a child who was left disabled by an emergency tracheotomy that left him permanently unable to ever breathe on his own without a mechanical respirator.

The film first received a two-part screening at Toronto's CentreStage Forum in November 1986, before being screened as a full feature documentary film at the 1987 Mayworks Festival and the 1987 Festival of Festivals.

The film received a Genie Award nomination for Best Feature Length Documentary at the 9th Genie Awards in 1988.

References

External links
 

1986 films
1986 documentary films
Canadian documentary films
1980s English-language films
1980s Canadian films